Transportation ballads are a genre of broadside ballad some of which became an important part of the folk song traditions of Britain and Ireland. They concern the transportation of convicted criminals firstly to the American colonies and then to penal colonies in Australia. Transportation ballads were published as broadsides, (song sheets sold cheaply in the streets, at markets and at fairs). Many have passed into the folk tradition and have been collected subsequently from traditional singers.

Ewan McColl wrote: 
"The element of protest, almost entirely absent in the confession songs, is a distinct feature of the 'Transportation Ballads'. Though these songs are generally cast in the same mould as confession songs, they display fewer traits of Grubb Street construction and, on the whole, the poetry, though often crude, is not without vigour. As a body they represent the most recent and perhaps the last great impulse towards song-making on the part of the English peasantry."

(Sleeve notes to "Chorus from the Gallows" with Peggy Seeger, 1963).

Motifs and themes

Cautionary Tales
Many transportation ballads contain, at some point, a warning to young men or women to avoid crime and bad company:

"Come all you young fellows take warning by me
And never go midnight walking and shun bad company.
And never go midnight walking or else you will rue the day
While you will get transported and sent to Botany Bay."

(From Botany Bay from the singing of Suffolk singer Jumbo Brightwell).

Come all you wild and wicked youths, wheresomever you may be
I pray now pay attention and listen unto me,
The fate of our poor transports, as you shall understand,
The hardships they do undergo upon Van Diemen's Land.
(From Van Diemen's Land 
from the singing of Norfolk singer Harry Cox).

A Decent Upbringing and Good Prospects
Often the ballads the narrator stresses his good upbringing, perhaps to emphasise his fall from grace:

My father and my mother dear they nourished me in my tender years,
They little thought I should be trapann'd and banished from my native land.
(From the broadside "The returned convict; or the horrors of transportation" (Roud V9114)

I was bound an apprentice in the County of Lanarkshire,
Unto a linen draper, O the truth that I will tell,
I bore a good character, and my master lov'd me well,
Till once in a jade's company, I happened for to fall.
(From the broadside The Convict)

Bad Companions and Evil Influences
The narrator usually blames bad companions, or, as in the quote from The Convict quoted above, a woman.

Sometimes the narrator becomes a criminal in order to support a woman.

I fell in love with a damsel, she was handsome and gay,
I neglected my work more and more every day.
And to keep her like a lady, I went on the highway,
And for that I got sent to Australia.
From "Australia" sung by the Suffolk singer Cyril Poacher,

Distressed Aged Parents and Faithful Sweethearts
The transported convict often left behind elderly parents and faithful sweethearts who showed their grief in various ways.

I oft-times looked behind me towards my native shore
And the cottage of contentment that I shall see no more;
Likewise my aged father who tore his hoary hair,
Also my tender mother whose arms did once me bear.

"Van Diemen's Land" from the singing of Harry Cox.

Farewell my aged mother, I'm vexed for what I've done,
I hope none will upcast to you the race that I have run;
I hope you'll be provided for when I am far awa,
Far frae the bonnie hills and dales o' Caledonia.

Farewell my honoured father, he is the best of men,
And likewise my own sweetheart, 'tis Catherine is her name;
Nae mair we'll walk by Clyde's clear stream or by the Broomielaw,
For I must leave the hills and dales o' Caledonia.

"Jamie Raeburn's Farewell" from the singing of Daisy Chapman

Harsh Treatment
The ballads emphasize "the hardships we do undergo upon Van Diemens Land". Conditions were certainly hard in all the Australian penal colonies.

Now the judges, they stand
With their whips in their hands,
They drive us, like horses,
To plough up the land.
You should see us poor young fellows
Working in that jail yard;
How hard is our fate in Australia.

From "Australia" from the singing of Bob Hart

They chained us two by two and whipped and lashed along 
They cut off our provisions if we did the least thing wrong 
They march us in the burning sun until our feet are sore 
So hard's our lot now we are got to Van Diemen's shore

We labour hard from morn to night until our bones do ache 
Then every one they must obey their mouldy beds must make 
We often wish when we lay down we ne'er may rise no more 
To meet our savage Governor upon Van Diemen's shore

Every night when I lay down I wet my straw with tears
While wind upon that horrid shore did whistle in our ears
Those dreadful beasts upon that land around our cots do roar
Most dismal is our doom upon Van Diemen's shore

From "The Female Transport" (Roud  V1284).

Examples

Botany Bay/Whitby Lad/Bound for Botany Boy/Adieu to Old England (Roud 261, Laws L16)
This ballad was collected widely from singers in England. It was also published by broadside sellers under the title "The Transport's Farewell", and was known in the US, with altered text, by various titles including "The Boston Burglar", "Boston City", "Charlestown" and "The Louisville Burglar".  The "Boston Burglar" variant made its way back across the Atlantic, and has been collected in Ireland, Scotland,(sometimes under the title "The Boston Smuggler", and England.

Come all you young fellows take warning by me
And never go midnight walking and shun bad company.
And never go midnight walking or else you will rue the day
While you will get transported and sent to Botany Bay.

My character was taken and I was taken too,
My parents tried to clear me but nothing could they do.
It was at the Old Bailey sessions where the judge unto me did say,
“Why the jury have found you guilty, young man, you must go to Botany Bay.”

To see my aged father as he stood at the bar,
Likewise my poor old mother a-tearing of her hair.
A-tearing of her old grey locks, why she unto me did say
“Why, oh son, oh son, what have you done to be sent to Botany Bay?”

A-sailing down the river on the fourteenth day of May,
There goes the ship of clever young men, they’re sorry, so they say.
There goes the ship of clever young men, they are sorry I heard them say.
It is for some crime that they’ve done in their time and they’re sent to Botany Bay.

Now there is a girl in London, a girl I love so well,
And if ever I gain my liberty, along with her I’ll dwell.
If ever I gain my liberty, it’s along with her I’ll dwell,
And I will shun bad company and be true to my love as well.

As sung by Suffolk singer Jumbo Brightwell, recorded by Keith Summers in 1971. This version is available to listen online at the British Library Sound Archive. The term "midnightwalking" in the first verse refers to poaching.

Jamie Raeburn's Farewell (Roud 600)
This Scottish transportation ballad was frequently printed in broadsides and has been collected or recorded from many traditional singers.

Robert Ford, in 'Vagabond Songs and Ballads of Scotland: With Many Old and Familiar Melodies' (1901) writes: 
"The above was long a popular street song, all over Scotland, and sold readily in penny sheet form. The hero of the verses, in whose mouth the words are put, I recently learned on enquiry, through the columns of the Glasgow Evening Times, was a baker to trade, who was sentenced to banishment for theft, more than sixty years ago. His sweetheart, Catherine Chandlier, thus told the story of his misfortunes: "We parted at ten o'clock and Jamie was in the police office at 20 minutes past ten. Going home, he met an acquaintance of his boyhood, who took him in to treat him for auld langsyne. Scarcely had they entered when the detectives appeared and apprehended them. Searched, the stolen property was found. They were tried and banished for life to Botany Bay. Jamie was innocent as the unborn babe, but his heartless companion spoke not a word of his innocence".

Ewan McColl observes that "The ballad found its way into the bothies and has been kept alive by the farm servants of North East Scotland for more than a hundred years". The Roud Folk Song Index lists 36 versions collected from traditional singers in Scotland, four from England and two from Northern Ireland. It has been collected from 2 singers in Australia, 2 in the US and 2 in Canada.

A version by the Scottish Traveller singer Jeannie Robertson, recorded by Alan Lomax in 1953 is in the online audio collection of the Association for Cultural Equity. A number of different versions by traditional singers recorded by Hamish Hamilton are available at the Tobar an Dualchais website.

Australia/Virginia (Roud 1488)
Other titles include "Virginny", "The Lads of Virginia", "The Transports of Virginia".

"It is one of a considerable number of transportation songs in the traditional repertoire, but is unusual in the nature and motive of the crime—highway robbery, “to keep her like a lady”; more often it's poaching, brought about by necessity. Also, and contrary to certain record sleeve-notes, the song owes little to Van Diemen's Land, but is clearly derived from a much earlier song called Virginny (a fragment of which was collected from Mrs Goodyear, of Axford, Hants, by George Gardiner in 1907), with the transport's destination having been changed to Australia when this became current (i.e. post “First Fleet”). This explains why the song is unusual; in the 18th century highwaymen were transported to Virginia—in the 19th they were topped!" Rod Stradling, sleeve notes to Oak Country Songs and Music.

Broadside versions from the 19th century seem to be exclusively of the Virginia version. A single version of "Virginny" was collected from a 74 year old singer, Mrs Goodyear, in Basingstoke, Hampshire, England in 1907. Versions of "Australia" were collected from four singers in Suffolk in the 1960s and 70s.

Recordings by Suffolk singers Bob Hart and George Ling are available at the British Library Sound Archive.

London prentice boy/The Convict (Roud 1501)
A young man is persuaded by a girl to murder and steal money from his master, but at the last minute decides against the murder because of his master's kindness. He takes the money, is betrayed by the girl, tried and transported.

This song was frequently reprinted by broadside publishers and has been collected from 3 singers in Suffolk, one in Gloucestershire and one in Australia. Broadside version. Two versions, by Suffolk singers Dick Woolnough and Bob Scarce, are available online at the British Library Sound Archive.

Van Diemen's Land/Gallant Poacher (Roud 519, Laws L18)
One of the most widely collected transportation ballads, this song deals with the fate of a poacher rather than a thief or highway robber. Poaching was not always seen as a crime by country people, and country singers (who were more often informants for early collectors) may well have had some sympathy for a poacher transport. Also, poaching was carried out in rural settings rather than the urban environment inhabited by apprentices gone to the bad. Roy Palmer argues that this song was written to chronicle the first cases, soon after 1828, when "it was enacted that if three or more men were found in a wood after dark and one of them carried a gun or a bludgeon, all were liable for transportation for fourteen years".

Broadside publishers throughout England, in Scotland and in Ireland printed and reprinted this song, and it has been collected from at least 26 singers in England, 9 in Scotland, 9 in Ireland, 7 in the US and 5 in Canada.

A version by Louis Killen, recorded by Keith Summers, is available online at the British Library Sound Archive. Several versions by Scottish singers are on the Tobar an Dualchais website.

Van Diemen's Land/Henry the Poacher (Roud 221)
Another song about a poacher transported, this ballad has all the classic ingredients, from the "warning take by me" in the first verse through the loving upbringing, bad companions, the crime, trial, sentence, voyage, and traumatic arrival - though the ending is somewhat softened,  It was widely published in broadsides during the 19th century, and was collected from traditional singers in England during the twentieth century.

There are two versions by traditional singers in the British Library Sound Archive, one by Norfolk singer Walter Pardon,  with the "Young men beware" refrain, recorded by Reg Hall in 1975, and four verses by an unnamed singer recorded by Stephen Sedley.

Others

There are many variations on the basic themes. Many broadside ballads about transportation have either not been adopted by traditional singers, or have been unrecorded by collectors.

References to Transportation in Other Traditional Songs

Maggie May (folk song) (Roud 1757)
The anti-heroine of this well known Liverpool folk song ends up in Botany Bay.

The Black Velvet Band (Roud 2146)
Although this is one of the best known songs to mention transportation, it doesn't fit the typical pattern of a transportation ballad. The narrator isn't guilty of the crime he was transported for, and the song doesn't discuss the mechanism of transportation. The caution at the end of the tale isn't to avoid crime - the narrator warns young men to "beware of the pretty colleens".

Flash Company/The Yellow Handkerchief (Roud 954)
Broadside versions of this song complain that transportation has parted the narrator from his/her lover, and suggest that the young men sent abroad as transports might be needed as soldiers in future wars.

Here's adieu to you judges you are too severe,
You have banished my true love far away from here,
But the rocks shall run to water and the rivers run dry, 
If ever I prove false to the girl that loves I.

If the wars should come again, what would Old England say?
They would wish for the lads they have sent o'er the sea,
They would wish for the transports to return back again,
To fight for Old England her rights to maintain.

However, some traditional versions leave out the transportation references entirely. Versions by the Suffolk singer Percy Webb and George Ling are in the British Library Sound Archive.

Jim Jones at Botany Bay (Roud 5478)
Though frequently recorded by modern folk singers, there is no evidence that this song was widely known in the nineteenth century, either in Australia or elsewhere. The Roud Folk Song Index contains a single entry. The song was included in a 1907 book of reminiscences, "Old Pioneering Days in the Sunny South", by Charles MacAlister, who drove bullock-teams in south-eastern New South Wales in the 1840s.  MacAlister describes the ballad as a "typical song of the convict days", but gives us no information as to who sang it or how he came to know it.

Ballads about Transportation and Ireland
Some ballads deal with Irishmen transported for political offences. These use different motifs from the English and Scottish ballads.
Examples include:
"Mitchell's Address"(Roud 5163), "The Isle of France" (Roud 1575), "The Boys of Mullaghbawn" (Roud 2362), and "The Maids Lamentation" (Roud V16510)

Ballads about Chartists, Trades Unionists and Transportation
English, Welsh  and Scottish people were also transported for political offences and ballads were composed in protest - for example, "Frost, Williams, and Jones's farewell to England" (Roud V15587), about John Frost and others transported during the Chartist struggle for adult male franchise,

The broadside "The Cotton Spinners Farewell" (Roud V15587) concerns some Scottish cotton spinners sentenced to seven years transportation for trades union activities.

Proper Objects for Botany Bay (Roud  V27861)
Most transportation ballads either accept transportation or deplore its cruelty. This ballad praises the practice and lists classes of people the author feels should be transported. It doesn't seem to have been printed often, and hasn't been collected from traditional singers.

References 

Forced migration
Convictism in Australia
Scottish ballads
English broadside ballads
British North America
Scottish folk songs
English folk songs
Irish ballads
Irish folk songs
British colonization of the Americas